Rogala is a Polish coat of arms, likely imported from Germany to Poland in 1109 by the Rogala or the Ribersztein family, that then added the second horn. It was used by several szlachta families in the times of the Polish–Lithuanian Commonwealth.

History

Blazon

Heraldist Kasper Niesiecki describes it as white with a red deer horn, and red with a white bull horn. The horns' place is swapped on the helmet.

Notable bearers

Notable bearers of this coat of arms include:
 House of Krasicki
 Ignacy Krasicki
 Józef Wybicki — Author of Polish national anthem, Mazurek Dąbrowskiego (Polski)
 Kost Levytsky (1859-1941) — Ukrainian politician, Chairman of State Secretariat of West Ukraine
 Mykhailo Levytsky (1774-1858) — Metropolitan Archbishop of the Ukrainian Greek Catholic Church
 Volodymyr Levytsky (1872-1956) — Ukrainian mathematician
 Wasielewski
 Karol Aleksander Krasicki
 Wiseł Czambor
 Ignacy Zaborowski
 Albrycht Zaborowski
 Janusz Kałuski
 Kulczyński
 Józef Zawadzki (chemist)[4]
 Aleksander Zawadzki (naturalist)
 Augustyn Ludwik Michał Brzeżański 
 Tadeusz Zawadzki
 Jan Boży Krasicki
 Ksawery (Xavier) Franciszek Krasicki
 Wacław Denhoff-Czarnocki
 Norbert Lewald-Jezierski
 Stanisław Sieciński
 Piotr Pilik
 Władysław Rozwadowski *
 Jan Gotfryd Biberstein-Krasicki *
 Jerzy Krasicki [3]
 Casmir Koczorowski [3]
 Bruno-Denis-Aeropagite-Marcel Kicinski [3]
 Samuel-Albert Lewicki [3]
 Kazimierz-Witold-Stanislaw Zawadzki [3]
 Stefan Rogala-Bojakowski

See also

 Krasiczyn Castle
 Polish heraldry
 Heraldry
 Coat of arms
 List of Polish nobility coats of arms

Related coat of arms 

 Hodyc coat of arms
 Iwanowski coat of arms
 Biberstein coat of arms

References

External links 
  Rogala Coat of Arms and bearers

Sources 
 Dynastic Genealogy  
 Ornatowski.com 
 sejm-wielki.pl [4]
 Herbarz polski Kaspra Niesieckiego S.J.By Kasper Niesiecki  [5]

Polish coats of arms